Blanche Hillyard defeated Alice Pickering 6–2, 7–5 in the All Comers' Final, and then defeated the reigning champion Charlotte Cooper 5–7, 7–5, 6–2 in the challenge round to win the ladies' singles tennis title at the 1897 Wimbledon Championships.

Draw

Challenge round

All Comers'

References

External links

Ladies' Singles
Wimbledon Championship by year – Women's singles
Wimbledon Championships - Singles
Wimbledon Championships - Singles